The Wildcats of St Trinian's is the fifth British comedy film set in the fictional St Trinian's School. Directed by Frank Launder, it was released in 1980.

The film pokes fun at the British trade union movement which had been responsible for the recent wave of strikes that culminated in the Winter of Discontent.

The film was not a critical or commercial success. It has yet to be released on DVD except in the US.

Plot
The girls of St. Trinian's hatch yet another fiendish plot—a trade union for British schoolgirls. Their friend and mentor, Flash Harry, suggests a plan which involves kidnapping girls from other rather more respectable colleges and substituting their own "agents". Thus begins a hilarious, often bloody, battle of wits as the girls meet resistance not only from Olga Vandermeer, their Headmistress, but from the Minister of Education, a private detective, and an oil sheikh. Despite all his desperate efforts to foil the conspiracy, the Minister has to face a growing realisation that the girls' demands will have to be met—for him this will mean a very great and very personal sacrifice.

Cast

 Sheila Hancock as Olga Vandemeer
 Michael Hordern as Sir Charles Hackforth
 Joe Melia as Flash Harry
 Thorley Walters as Hugo Culpepper Brown
 Rodney Bewes as Peregrine Butters
 Deborah Norton as Miss Brenner
 Maureen Lipman as Miss Katy Higgs
 Julia McKenzie as Miss Dolly Dormancott
 Ambrosine Phillpotts as Mrs Mowbray
 Rose Hill as Miss Martingale
 Diana King as Miss Mactavish
 Luan Peters as Miss Poppy Adams
 Barbara Hicks as Miss Coke
 Rosalind Knight as Miss Walsh
 Patsy Smart as Miss Warmold
 Bernadette O'Farrell as Miss Carfax
 Sandra Payne as Miss Taylor
 Hilda Braid as Miss Summers
 Ballard Berkeley as Humphrey Wills
 Frances Ruffelle as Angela Hall / Princess Roxanne
 Danielle Corgan as Eva Potts
 Lisa Vanderpump as Ursula
 Debbie Linden as Mavis
 Veronica Quilligan as Lizzie
 Miranda Hunnisett as Jennie
 Eileen Fletcher as Harriet
 Sarah-Jane Varley as Janet
 Theresa Ratcliff as Maggie
 Sandra Hall as Frieda
 Suzanna Hamilton as Matilda

Production
It had been fourteen years since the previous St Trinians film. "I didn't want to do another St Trinians unless it could top the previous one," said Launder during filming. "I think this one does." Sidney Gilliat was a production consultant.

Reception
Derek Malcolm of The Guardian called it "one of the worst films I've ever seen... Please don't do anything like it again. Ever."

Launder wanted to follow the film with an adaptation of the books by Norman Thelwell about a pony school. He almost made it in Norway in the late 1970s and in 1979 planned on making it in Britain the following year. However no movie resulted.

References

External links
 ST Trinians World-The Wildcats of St. Trinian's
 
 

1980 films
1980s high school films
1980s teen comedy films
British sequel films
British teen comedy films
Films directed by Frank Launder
Films shot in Berkshire
St Trinian's films
1980 comedy films
1980s English-language films
1980s British films